Mesembrina is a genus from the fly family Muscidae.

Species
These 16 species belong to the genus Mesembrina:

 Mesembrina asternopleuris Fan, 1992 c g
 Mesembrina aurocaudata Emden, 1965 c g
 Mesembrina ciliimaculata Fan & Zheng, 1992 c g
 Mesembrina decipiens Loew, 1873 c g b
 Mesembrina intermedia (Zetterstedt, 1849) c g
 Mesembrina latreillii Robineau-Desvoidy, 1830 i c g b
 Mesembrina magnifica Aldrich, 1925 c g
 Mesembrina meridiana (Linnaeus, 1758) c g
 Mesembrina montana Zimin, 1951 c g
 Mesembrina mystacea (Linnaeus, 1758) c g
 Mesembrina nigribasis Kuchta & Savage, 2008 c g
 Mesembrina pallida (Say, 1829) c g
 Mesembrina resplendens Wahlberg, 1844 c g
 Mesembrina respondens Wahlberg, 1844 c g
 Mesembrina solitaria (Knab, 1914) i
 Mesembrina tristis Aldrich, 1926 c g

Data sources: i = ITIS, c = Catalogue of Life, g = GBIF, b = Bugguide.net

References

Muscidae
Diptera of Europe
Brachycera genera
Taxa named by Johann Wilhelm Meigen